"Clampdown" is a song by the English rock band the Clash from their 1979 album London Calling.  The song began as an instrumental track called "Working and Waiting". It is sometimes called "Working for the Clampdown" which is the main lyric of the song, and also the title provided on the album's lyric sheet.  Its lyrics concern those who have forsaken the idealism of youth and urges young people to fight the status quo. The word 'clampdown' is a neat cover-all term the writers adopted to define the oppressive Establishment, notably its more reactionary voices who were to be heard throughout the 1970s calling alarmingly for "clampdowns" by government and law enforcement on strikers, agitators, benefits claimants, football hooligans, punks and other perceived threats to the social, economic and moral wellbeing of the UK. 

In 1980 "Clampdown" was released as a single backed with "The Guns of Brixton" in Australia. The single was not released in any other territories, with the exception of US promos.

Analysis of lyrics
"Clampdown" was written by Joe Strummer and Mick Jones.

The song's lyrics, written by Joe Strummer, refers to the perceived failures of capitalist society. The wearing of the "blue and brown" refers to the color of the uniforms that are mostly worn by workers.  This idea goes along with lyrics that refer to "young believers" who are brought and bought into the capital system by those "working for the clampdown" who will "teach our twisted speech." Alternatively it could be suggested that the blue and brown refer to shirt colours, the fascist Blueshirts of 1930s Ireland and the Brownshirts of the early Nazis in Germany. Strummer wrote,

The men in the factory are old and cunning 
You don't owe nothing, so boy get running! 
It's the best years of your life they want to steal! 
You grow up and you calm down and you're working for the clampdown. 
You start wearing the blue and brown and you're working for the clampdown. 
So you got someone to boss around. It makes you feel big now...

These lyrics are seen to refer to how one gets caught by the capital economic system and its ethos of work, debt, power, position and conformist lifestyle. Strummer, who proclaimed himself a socialist, also uses the song's closing refrain to highlight this mindset as a potential trap and offers a warning not to give oneself over to "the clampdown".  This is emphasized in the coda by Jones' repetition of the words "work" and "more work" on the beat over Strummers breathy repetition of the phrase "working for the clampdown".  This reaffirms the idea that Strummer saw "the clampdown" as a threat to all who get caught up in the modern economic wage-hour system. Bass player and Clash co-founder Paul Simonon, in an interview with the LA Times, spoke about the opportunities available to him in the early 1970s U.K. after he finished his secondary education:

Strummer, like Simonon, spent time on the dole, but Strummer did not come from a lower-class family. In the same interview with the LA Times Strummer said,

Strummer's father was a British diplomat, and Joe was sent away to boarding school where he detested "the thick rich people’s thick rich kids".  Strummer said,

Later verses suggest an alternative in revolution, a theme common throughout Joe Strummer's songwriting.  This point of view also points to the lyric "You start wearing the blue and brown" as supporting their cause.  The barely audible lyrics at the beginning of the song were deciphered by Clash fan Ade Marks, and first published in Q magazine's Clash special :

The kingdom is ransacked, the jewels all taken back
And the chopper descends
They're hidden in the back, with a message on a half-baked tape
With the spool going round, saying I'm back here in this place
And I could cry
And there's smoke you could click on
What are we going to do now?

Analysis of music

The song is mostly in the key of A major, with a key change to E major in the bridge.

The coda features a bouncing dance, alternating between G and F# chords as the riff slowly fades, featuring Strummer's ad libs and the repeated lyric based on "work".

Cover versions
"Clampdown" was later covered by Rage Against the Machine at their first live show in 1991, as well as during a show in Antwerp, Belgium, on 2 June 2008. It was also covered by Indigo Girls and can be heard on Rarities (2005) as well as the Clash tribute album Burning London: The Clash Tribute (1999).  The song was also covered by The Strokes (at their Oxegen and T in the Park appearances in July 2004), Poster Children on their 2004 release, On the Offensive, and   Another band that covered this song was Hot Water Music, on their B sides and rarities compilation album called Till the Wheels Fall Off. The song was also covered by The National on the album A Tribute to The Clash, and by Inward Eye, which they released through a video on their YouTube channel. Bruce Springsteen and the E Street Band covered the song a few times on their 2014 High Hopes Tour. Metallica played the song at the 2016 Bridge School Benefit. District Attorney of Philadelphia Larry Krasner covered the song with the punk band Sheer Mag days before his first election to office in May 2017, as documented in his memoir For the People: A Story of Justice and Power.

Popular reference
The song was featured in the Futurama episode, "The Silence of the Clamps", where the song is played over a montage of Clamps and Fry spending time together. The song was also used in the US television show Malcolm in the Middle during an episode where Malcolm and some misfits organize an anti-prom called "Morp".

In September 2018, during one of the debates between incumbent United States senator Ted Cruz and United States congressman Beto O'Rourke held as part of the campaign for that year's United States Senate election in Texas, O'Rourke claimed that Cruz was "working for the clampdown".
O'Rourke would later use the song in his official campaign launch in El Paso.

Rock Band music gaming platform 
It was made available to download on 1 February 2011 for use in the Rock Band 3 music gaming platform in both Basic rhythm, and PRO mode which utilizes real guitar / bass guitar, and MIDI compatible electronic drum kits / keyboards in addition to vocals.

Track listing
 7" vinyl (Australia)
 "Clampdown" (Strummer/Jones) – 3:48
 "Guns of Brixton" (Paul Simonon) – 3:09

Personnel
The following people contributed to "Clampdown":

The Clash
 Joe Strummer – vocals, guitar
 Mick Jones – vocals, guitar 
 Paul Simonon – bass guitar
 Topper Headon – drums, percussion
Additional musician
 Mickey Gallagher – organ
Production
 Guy Stevens – producer
 Bill Price – chief engineer 
 Jerry Green – second engineer

Notes

References

External links
 songmeanings about Clampdown
 ‘Let Fury Have the Hour’: The Passionate Politics of Joe Strummer
 LA Times article

1980 singles
The Clash songs
Songs written by Mick Jones (The Clash)
Songs written by Joe Strummer
Song recordings produced by Guy Stevens
1979 songs
CBS Records singles
Songs about labor
Songs against capitalism